RepRisk AG is an environmental, social, and corporate governance (ESG) data science company based in Zurich, Switzerland, specializing in ESG and business-conduct risk research, and quantitative solutions.

The company runs an online due-diligence database that allows clients to monitor and assess the risk exposure of companies, infrastructure projects, sectors, and countries related to 28 ESG issues.  The issues are mapped to the 10 principles of the UN Global Compact, the Sustainability Accounting Standards Board (SASB) Materiality Map, and the United Nations Sustainable Development Goals (SDGs).

On a daily basis, RepRisk assesses ESG risks such as environmental degradation, human rights abuses, child labor, forced labor, fraud, and corruption that can impact an organization's reputation, financial profitability, or lead to compliance issues. Financial institutions and corporations use RepRisk to prevent and mitigate ESG and business conduct risks related to their operations, business relationships, and investments.

The RepRisk database systematically identifies ESG risks by analyzing over 100,000 sources per day in 20 major business languages.  As of July 2020, the database covered more than 150,000 public and private companies, and over 40,000 infrastructure projects reported to have links to ESG risks, as well as ESG risks related to all countries and 34 different sectors.  It also includes data on ESG issues and topics, over 20,000 NGOs, and over 15,000 governmental bodies.

History
RepRisk was formed in 1998 as ECOFACT, a Zurich-based environmental and social risk consultancy focused on the financial sector. In 2006, its ESG risk database was created at the request of UBS, and in 2010, RepRisk split from the consultancy and became an independent company.

Methodology

Research scope and process
RepRisk screens, on a daily basis, over 100,000 public sources and external stakeholders, including international and local print and online media, news websites, newsletters, NGOs, governmental bodies, think tanks, blogs and Twitter, in 20 major business languages. This screening identifies companies and projects linked to ESG-related risk.  RepRisk monitors 28 ESG issues (for example local pollution, child labor or tax evasion) and 67 topic tags, or "hot topics" (such as palm oil, arctic drilling, indigenous people, coal, or water scarcity). The research scope is defined in accordance with international standards and norms, such as the ten principles of the United Nations Global Compact (UNGC) and Sustainability Accounting Standards Board (SASB).

To achieve consistent data over time, RepRisk's database uses strict, rules-based processes that incorporate both artificial intelligence and machine learning with human intelligence.  The following steps outline the high level RepRisk screening process:
 Sources are screened through the company’s proprietary AI tool that identifies risk incidents through text and metadata extraction from unstructured content, followed by multi-lingual de-duplication and clustering processes.
 An analyst studies adverse incidents, defines severity and novelty of each, using international standards.
 Relevant entities (companies, projects, sectors, and countries) are linked to the risk event, assigned a title, and a summary is completed.
 The compiled news passes a quality check prior to being released to the RepRisk ESG risk platform database.

RepRisk Index (RRI)
The RepRisk Index (RRI) is a proprietary algorithm that dynamically captures and quantifies the reputational exposure to ESG and business conduct risks. The RRI is a quantitative measure ranging from 1 (lowest) to 100 (highest).

Companies that have been exposed to higher levels of criticism in the past are less sensitive to new adverse events and allegations in comparison to a company that experiences a first-time incident. If a company does not experience new criticism, their score will eventually drop to zero over a maximum period of two years.

A current RRI value indicates the current media and stakeholder exposure.  The Peak RRI is an overall risk exposure indicator that indicates the highest level of criticism over the past two years.

The RRI score is calculated based on a number of factors, including the influence of the source of the information, the frequency and timing of criticisms, and the novelty and severity of the criticism.

RepRisk Rating (RRR) 
The RepRisk Rating (RRR) is a letter rating (AAA to D) and is similar to a credit rating.   It facilitates benchmarking and ESG integration.  Available only to companies, it combines a company’s own ESG risk exposure with the ESG risk exposure of the countries and sectors in which the company has been exposed to risks. Both the Rating and the RRI are updated daily for all companies in the database.

RepRisk UN Global Compact Violator Flag 
This indicator identifies companies with a high potential risk of violating one or more of the ten UNGC Principles. The flag allows users to see if the UNGC violations are primarily linked to the operations or to the supply chain  of a company.

External use of data 
 FactSet used RepRisk as their first third party provider of environment, social, and governance (ESG) and business conduct risk data on the new Open: Marketplace Platform and FactSet Workstation.
 UBS was RepRisk's first client and in 2010, as part of a broader corporate responsibility initiative, UBS expanded its global compliance database to include information gathered about environmental and social risks by RepRisk. The data is applied to companies, prospective sourcing partners and investment clients to identify risks that could impact the bank's reputation and financial performance. In 2011, UBS expanded its global compliance database to include information on environmental and social issues provided by RepRisk, a global research firm specialized in environmental, social and corporate governance (ESG) risk analytics and metrics. This was done in an effort to mitigate environmental and social risks that could impact the bank's reputation or financial performance and to simultaneously help globally standardize and systematically implement the firm's due diligence processes. RepRisk data is used in the on-boarding process to screen potential new clients and sourcing partners, alongside periodic client reviews and, also, to evaluate the risks related to transactions in investment banking and institutional lending.
 Dow Jones Sustainability Index (DJSI) / RobecoSAM: RobecoSAM uses RepRisk as part of the Media and Stakeholder Analysis section of its Corporate Sustainability Assessment for the Dow Jones Sustainability Index, in order to identify companies' involvement in environmental, economic and social situations that may have a damaging effect on their reputation and core business.  Once a company is listed on the DJSI, it is monitored daily for any critical arising issues, which can lead to the exclusion of the company if deemed critical enough. Examples of events that would lead to exclusion include: commercial practices, human rights abuses, layoffs or worker disputes, or catastrophic disasters. This monitoring is supported by RepRisk, a global research firm and provider of environmental, social and governance (ESG) risk data. RepRisk screens media outlets, stakeholder groups and other publicly available sources to identify risks related to these issues. The information gathered is then systematically analyzed and quantified. If a critical event happens, the situation is analyzed by RobecoSAM for the scope in which it reaches. If large enough, the event will be analyzed further based on severity, media coverage, and crisis management. RobecoSAM analysts decide from here whether the company will be excluded from the DJSI. An assurance report is completed by Deloitte to ensure the validity of the company's information.
 FTSE: RepRisk data is among the ESG data providers used by FTSE in their ESG methodology for various benchmarks.
 The Norwegian Global Pension Fund selected RepRisk in 2009. RepRisk was selected again in 2013. To support the ethical screening process, the Council on Ethics works with RepRisk ESG Business Intelligence, a global research firm and provider of environmental, social and governance (ESG) risk data. RepRisk monitors the companies in the Norwegian Pension Fund's portfolio for issues such as severe human rights violations, particularly regarding child labor, forced labor, and violations of individual rights in conflict areas, as well as gross environmental degradation and corruption. RepRisk has been working with the Council on Ethics since 2009 and in 2014, re-won the tender for ESG data provision for 2014-2017.
 First Sentier Investors: RepRisk is used to screen companies in their portfolios and for company engagement.
 BASF: RepRisk data is used in part to screen the suppliers for ESG-related risks.
 The Sustainability Accounting Standards Board (SASB) uses RepRisk data as an input for the development of sustainability accounting standards by supporting its evidence-based research.
 Carbon Disclosure Project: RepRisk's data serves as an input in the evaluation of companies for CDP's Climate Performance Leaders and Water Performance Leaders, which outlines the top companies around the world doing the most to combat climate change and to manage their water resources, respectively. RepRisk's data adds to the current evaluation process by validating company-provided information and clarifying how a company's policies, commitments and initiatives translate into performance.
UN-supported Principles for Responsible Investment (PRI): The RepRisk database is used by the UNPRI's Investment Engagement team.
 Global 100 Ranking: RepRisk's assessment data was incorporated in the sanctions portion of the screening of the Global 100 Most Sustainable Corporations in the World annual ranking and sustainability equity index managed by Corporate Knights Capital.
 World's Most Ethical Companies ranking: RepRisk's data is used as part of the 2015 evaluation process to validate self-reported scores provided by companies who completed the Ethics Quotient survey, the underlying framework for the World's Most Ethical Companies designation published by Ethisphere.
 2014 Newsweek Green Rankings: Newsweek incorporated RepRisk assessments of reputational risk for companies for the "Reputation Score" indicator in their 2014 Green Rankings. The Newsweek Green Rankings are one of the world's most recognized assessments of corporate environmental performance.
 Ecolab: RepRisk’s Industry and Country Risk scores are available in the risk analysis section of the Water Risk Monetizer developed by Ecolab.
JUST Capital: RepRisk data used in JUST Capital's 2017 ranking of America's Most JUST Companies report as input to evaluate the performance of the largest publicly traded corporations in the U.S. 
Chartered Quality Institute: RepRisk data used for Technology on Trial 2018 report by the Chartered Quality Institute to find sector wide governance failures after assessing the world’s leading technology companies. 
World Business Council for Sustainable Development: (2018) RepRisk data used in Reporting Matters 2018 publication to evaluate the Balance indicator of WBCSD’s framework. 
Nest: Nest began integrating RepRisk data in 2019 into its ESG initiatives and investment decision process, to allow the pension scheme to consider the investment risks and opportunities associated with ESG factors to provide a more holistic view of companies, alongside the more traditional investment risk factors. 
Aqueduct Water Risk Atlas: Aqueduct Water Risk Atlas employed RepRisk's proprietary Country Sector Matrix in 2019 to understand the broader country-specific ESG and reputational risks that may threaten water quantity, quality, and access. 
State Street Global Advisors: State Street Global Advisors launched SPDR S&P 500 ESG in 2019 with 'fast-exit' feature based on RepRisk data. If a company is reported by RepRisk to have violated its RepRisk Index threshold of 70, it will be removed from the index within two business days. 
Corporate Knights: Corporate Knights use RepRisk data to identify companies who have violated UN Global Compact Principles in their Carbon Clean 200 list 2020. 
Crux Informatics partners with RepRisk to accelerate ESG market reach and delivery capabilities in 2020. 
As of 2020, BattleFin’s alternative data suite of solutions includes RepRisk data. 
ICE Data Services is integrating ESG risk data from RepRisk into its ESG Reference Data service in 2020. 
In 2020, J.P. Morgan’s DataQuery offers RepRisk’s data.

Data products and services 

RepRisk data is available in various formats and products and is searchable online:

 Benchmarking Briefs benchmark the ESG risk exposure for up to ten companies.
 Company Reports outline the ESG and business conduct risks for a single company, and are available via PDF.
 Supplier Monitoring Briefs and Portfolio Monitoring Reports are also available on a monthly or quarterly basis and identify companies in a supplier list or investment portfolio that are most exposed to ESG risks, and are most likely to violate internal policies, ethical guidelines, or international standards and are available via PDF.

Publications and research

Annual Most Controversial Companies Report 
Since 2013, RepRisk releases a yearly ranking of the top ten most controversial companies in the world, related to ESG issues. The ranking is based on the companies that have the highest RRI over a particular year.

Annual Most Controversial Projects Report 
Since 2013, RepRisk releases a yearly ranking of the top ten most controversial projects in the world, related to ESG issues. The ranking is based on the projects that have the highest RRI over a particular year.

Research
 The Effect Of Bad News On Credit Risk (Research Study): Julian Koelbel, a PhD student at the Swiss Federal Institute of Technology (ETH) in Zurich, used RepRisk data in the research study: The effect of bad news on credit risk: a media based view of the pricing of corporate social responsibility. The paper, which won an Award for Excellence in Responsible Investment Research at the UN PRI's annual Academic Network conference in 2013, highlighted that more negative news on CSR issues are associated with higher credit default swap spreads. The study is published in the Strategic Management Journal.
 ESG Alpha in China (Research Study): Michael Barnett of the Centre for Corporate Reputation at Oxford University, and Jimmy Chen, Andreas Hoepner and Qian Li from the Centre for Responsible Banking & Finance at the University of St Andrews, used RepRisk data as the basis for their recent research paper, "ESG Alpha in China." The research paper, which investigated the effect of ESG risks on the share performance of Chinese firms and found that ESG criteria can be used to generate alpha for investments in Chinese companies, won the European PRI award in the category of Investment Strategy.
Kepler Cheuvreux: Kepler Cheuvreux and Affectio Mutandi included RepRisk data in their Soft Law Violation & Liability research report, one of a series of reports produced by the company surrounding business ethics. Kepler Cheuvreux also featured RepRisk in its “The Responsible Investor Playbook” published in 2016.
 RepRisk and CSRHub published a joint research report in May 2015 on the relationship between perceived CSR performance (based on CSRHub data) and reputational risk exposure related to ESG issues (based on RepRisk data).
 ESG Performance of European investment funds. 
 The effect of bad news on reputation and share price: An empirical survey.
 Does Corporate Social Responsibility Benefit Society? Jun Li, University of Michigan, Stephen M. Ross School of Business, and Di (Andrew) Wu, University of Michigan, Stephen M. Ross School of Business (2017).
 The Relationship between Sustainability Performance and Sustainability Disclosure—Reconciling Voluntary Disclosure Theory and Legitimacy Theory
 How Media Coverage of Corporate Social Irresponsibility Increases Financial Risk
 Corporate Social Responsibility and Firm Reputation Risk
 The Price of Ignoring ESG Risks
Kepler Cheuvreux: Kepler Cheuvreux released their 2016 special report on tools in SRI-ESG field based on RepRisk data, including use cases, links with academic research, and underlying methodological assumptions.
(2019) Citi Global Data Insights: Citi Global Data Insights published The Rise of AI in ESG Evolution in 2019, featuring RepRisk's proprietary research methodology.

Partners
Selected RepRisk partner list.

References

Analytics companies
Companies based in Zürich
Macroeconomics consulting firms
Ethical investment
Financial data vendors
Financial services companies established in 1998
Risk management companies
Risk analysis methodologies
Social responsibility organizations
Environmental organisations based in Switzerland
Rating systems